The First Hurrah! is a collection of traditional Irish folk songs performed by The Clancy Brothers and Tommy Makem. It was their fifth album for Columbia Records and was released in 1964. The album's title is likely a play on Edwin O'Connor's 1956 novel The Last Hurrah. The original LP featured liner notes by critic Robert Sherman. The album appeared on the Billboard charts and its single, "The Leaving of Liverpool," on the Irish Top 10 charts.

Reception

Billboard chose the album as a "Special Merit Pick." The magazine's review praised the Clancys and Makem's "fun and exuberance" and referred to the record as "another strong sampling of the boys' zesty and humorous approach" to Irish folklore. Billboard also reviewed the singles record taken from The First Hurrah!, which Columbia released prior to the full LP. The article rated "The Leaving of Liverpool" with four stars. Side B of the single, "The Gallant Forty-Twa," received three stars.

Track listing
All songs traditional.

Side one
"The Leaving of Liverpool" - 2:46
"The Mermaid" – 3:00
"Rocky Road to Dublin" – 2:28
"Johnny Todd" – 2:02
"Rosin the Bow" – 2:37
"The West's Awake" – 3:22

Side two
"Row, Bullies, Row" – 1:39
"Gallant Forty-Twa" – 2:29
"An Poc Ar Buile (The Mad Goat)" – 2:31
"Carrickfergus" – 2:30
"Bonny Charlie" – 3:30 
"Kelly, the Boy from Killann" – 2:35

Personnel
Liam Clancy - vocals, guitar
Pat Clancy - vocals, harmonica
Tom Clancy - vocals
Tommy Makem - vocals, banjo, tin whistle
The sound of a drum can be heard on the eighth track, but it is not certain who played it. Also, a mandolin is played on the first track, but it is also not certain who played it.

Chart positions
The First Hurrah! spent six weeks on Billboard Magazine's list of the top 150 full-length albums of all genres released in the United States. On 30 May the album reached #91 in the chart, its highest position.

"The Leaving of Liverpool" from the album stayed on the singles chart in Ireland for a few weeks. It reached #6 on the chart and stayed there for two weeks in late March 1964.

References

1964 albums
The Clancy Brothers albums
Albums produced by Tom Wilson (record producer)
Columbia Records albums